Hermann Stork (30 August 1911 – 12 June 1962) was a German diver who competed in the 1936 Summer Olympics. In 1936 he won the bronze medal in the 10 metre platform event.

References

1911 births
1962 deaths
German male divers
Olympic divers of Germany
Divers at the 1936 Summer Olympics
Olympic bronze medalists for Germany
Olympic medalists in diving
Medalists at the 1936 Summer Olympics
20th-century German people